Natasha is a name of Russian origin.

Natasha may also refer to:

Natasha (1974 film), an Argentine film
Natasha (2001 film), a Serbian film
Natasha (2015 film), a Canadian film
Natasha (2020 film), a Russian-language film
Natasha (crater), a crater on the Moon
Natasha (monkey), a macaque at the Safari Park zoo near Tel Aviv, Israel
Natasha (EP), an extended play by Pig Destroyer, or the title song
"Natasha" (Rufus Wainwright song), a song from the 2003 album Want One by Rufus Wainwright
Natasha (Sesame Street), a character on Sesame Street

See also
Natacha (disambiguation)

de:Natascha (Begriffsklärung)